Ibrahim Medical College (IMC) is a private medical school in Bangladesh, established in 2002. It is located in the Shahbag neighborhood of Dhaka. It has another campus in Shegunbagicha. It is affiliated with University of Dhaka as a constituent college.

History 
The college is associated with Bangladesh Institute of Research and Rehabilitation for Diabetes, Endocrine and Metabolic Disorders (BIRDEM), which is the largest medical organization in the world for diabetes treatment, a 600-bed multidisciplinary teaching hospital founded by national professor Muhammad Ibrahim. The hospital was established in 1980 with the financial support of Bangladesh. At BIRDEM, 3,000 patients are treated in the outpatient department every day. No other hospital in Bangladesh or elsewhere treats so many diabetes patients. According to Denmark-based multinational pharmaceutical company Novo Nordics Vice President of the Pacific Ocean, Selvam Afsar Tuna, this is the world's largest hospital in treating diabetes. It has been designated as a WHO Collaborating Centre on Diabetes, Endocrine and Metabolic Disorders, as the only one of its kind in Asia.

Academics
Ibrahim Medical College offers a five-year course of study leading to Bachelor of Medicine, Bachelor of Surgery (MBBS) & Bachelor of Dental Surgery (BDS).A one-year internship after graduation is compulsory for all graduates. They undertake their internship training at BIRDEM Hospital. The degree is recognized by Bangladesh Medical and Dental Council.

Journal 
IMC Journal of Medical Science, previously known as Ibrahim Medical College Journal is the official journal of Ibrahim Medical College. It is Index DOAJ, JournalTOCs, Google Scholar and MEDLINE listed.

Recognition
Ibrahim Medical College has been accorded:
 
 Recognition by the Bangladesh Medical and Dental Council (BMDC).
 Listing in International Medical Education Directory (IMED), FAIMER, which will enable its graduates to appear at ECFMG and other entrance examinations abroad.

See also
 List of medical colleges in Bangladesh

References

External links 
  https://www.facebook.com/profile.php?id=100007994175323

Medical colleges in Bangladesh
Universities and colleges in Dhaka
Hospitals in Dhaka
Educational institutions established in 2002
2002 establishments in Bangladesh